Route 955 is a Canadian highway in Westmorland County, New Brunswick.

Route description
The route's eastern terminus is in Mates Corner at Route 15. It travels east crossing Fox Creek Shemogue Harbour through a mostly treed area near Johnston Point then passes through Chapman Corner. As the route crosses McKays Creek, and Amos Creek, the route turns more north before entering Cadmans Corner. From here, the route turns east again following the Northumberland Strait and passes Murray Beach Provincial Park. From here the route crosses the Little Shemogue River as it enters Murray Corner, then enters Spence Settlement. From here, it crosses Route 16 near Confederation Bridge and Cape Jourimain. From here, it continues past through Bayfield then ending in Cape Tormentine at Route 960.

History
The route ends at the end at the former Route 16 Prince Edward Island ferry crossing before the realignment for the Confederation Bridge.

See also
List of New Brunswick provincial highways

References

New Brunswick provincial highways
Roads in Westmorland County, New Brunswick